Chrysoritis swanepoeli, the Swanepoel's opal, is a species of butterfly in the family Lycaenidae. It is endemic to South Africa, where it is found in the Swartberg Pass and Schoemanskloof, the Groot Swartberg, the Huis River Pass and Gamkaskloof in the Western Cape.

The wingspan is 23–26 mm for males and 24–34 mm for females. Adults are on wing from October to January. There is one extended generation per year.

The larvae feed on Thesium species and Tylecodon paniculata. They are attended to by Crematogaster liengmei ants.

Subspecies
Chrysoritis swanepoeli swanepoeli (South Africa: Western Cape)
Chrysoritis swanepoeli hyperion (Dickson, 1975) (South Africa: Western Cape)

References

Chrysoritis
Butterflies described in 1965
Endemic butterflies of South Africa
Taxonomy articles created by Polbot
Taxobox binomials not recognized by IUCN